The 2015–16 season of the Serie A is the 33rd season of top-tier futsal in Italy, 27th known as Serie A, which began September 19, 2015 and will finish on April 16, 2016. At the end of the regular season the top eight teams will play in the championship playoffs. The quarter and semi-finals will be a best of three series and the final will be a best of five-game series. The champions will then be Italy's representative in the 2016-2017 UEFA Futsal Cup.  With 13 teams participating this season the last place team will automatically be relegated to Serie A2 and the twelfth and eleventh placed teams will have a two-legged playoff to determine the second team to be relegated.

Events
Theisis the first Serie A championship to have 13 teams to play for the Scudetto. This season is the return of Montesilvano after two seasons of absence. They are the current record holder for appearances in the top flight (22 seasons). The city of Montesilvano will have the only derby of the season, which will see the seagulls opposite Acqua e Sapone. Cosenza and Carlisport Cogianco are making their debut in Serie A. Fabrizio has also changed its name and colors, becoming "FC5 Corigliano Futsal" to better represent the city of Corigliano Calabro.

Schedule Breaks
The Divisione Calcio a 5 has published the calendar of the championship on August 12. The season will break on December 5 through 12 for the World Cup qualifiers. January 23 to February 13 for the finals of the European Championship which will be played in Serbia. March 5 for the final eight of the Coppa Italia. March 19 and April 9 for the home and away play-off qualifiers for the World Cup in 2016 in Colombia.

Penalty
This season the Pescara reflects the downgrade of 1 point in the standings from the National Federal Court in the previous season for the delay of payments to its own cardholder.

Cosenza Excluded
In accepting the irrevocable resignation of its president and legal representative, on October 12, 2015, Futsal Cosenza decided the cessation of the championship with immediate effect. Since exclusion was made during the fourth round, all the matches played by the team do not count towards the league table. The team was also fined the maximum penalty by law, (30,000.00 Euros), for having seriously affected the performance of the entire season.

2015-16 Season teams

Regular season table

Cosenza Games
Cosenza is excluded from playing in the championship with immediate effect (Round 4). The games held previously by the team were not considered valid for ranking. In the remaining league games, the team that would face Cosenza will now have a bye.

Calendar and Results

Regular Season Top Scorers

Relegation playoff

1st leg

2nd leg

Napoli wins 10–4 on aggregate and remains in Serie A. Lazio is relegated to Serie A2.

Championship playoffs

Calendar

Bracket

Quarter-finals

1st match

2nd match

3rd Match

Semifinals

1st match

2nd match

3rd match

Final

1st match

2nd match

3rd match

4th match

Champion

References

External links 
 Divisione calcio a 5

Serie A (futsal) seasons
Italy
Futsal